A list of films produced in Hong Kong in 1967:

1967

References

External links
 IMDB list of Hong Kong films
 Hong Kong films of 1967 at HKcinemamagic.com

1967
Lists of 1967 films by country or language
Films